Derbyshire County Cricket Club in 1908 was the cricket season when the English club  Derbyshire had been playing for thirty-seven years. It was their fourteenth season in the County Championship and  they won five matches to finish fourteenth in the Championship table.

1908 season

Derbyshire  played twenty games in the County Championship and one match against the touring Gentlemen of Philadelphia.  The captain for the year was Reginald Rickman. Ernest Needham was top scorer and  Arnold Warren took most wickets.

The most significant additions to the Derbyshire squad in the season was Leonard Oliver who played regularly for Derbyshire until 1924. Also making their debuts were Richard Sale who played over five years, Francis Taylor who played over four years and Albert Howcroft who played over three years.  Arthur Sherwin played several matches but only in the 1908 season and William Thompson and John Eyre played their single career matches in the season.

Matches

Statistics

County Championship batting averages

(a) Figures adjusted for non CC matches

J Eyre and N Todd also played for Derbyshire in the match against Gentlemen of Philadelphia.

County Championship bowling averages

Wicket Keeping

 Joe Humphries  Catches 55,  Stumping  5

See also
Derbyshire County Cricket Club seasons
1908 English cricket season

References

1908 in English cricket
Derbyshire County Cricket Club seasons
English cricket seasons in the 20th century